is a 1966 Japanese film directed by Tomotaka Tasaka. It was Japan's submission to the 39th Academy Awards for the Academy Award for Best Foreign Language Film, but was not accepted as a nominee.

Cast
 Yoshiko Sakuma as Saku
 Katsuo Nakamura as Ukichi Matsumiya
 Nakamura Ganjirō II as Samezaemon
 Hisano Yamaoka as Matsue Torii
 Minoru Chiaki as Kidayu Momose
 Michiyo Kogure as Suzuko
 Kirin Kiki as Kayo Sugumo
 Kunie Tanaka as Kenkichi Ohara
 Chiyo Okada as Masuko
 Junko Miyazono as Teruko

See also
 List of submissions to the 39th Academy Awards for Best Foreign Language Film
 List of Japanese submissions for the Academy Award for Best Foreign Language Film

References

External links
 (misread the Japanese title)

1966 films
1960s Japanese-language films
Japanese drama films
Films directed by Tomotaka Tasaka
1960s Japanese films